Holmes is the given name of:

 Holmes Alexander (1906–1985), American historian, journalist, syndicated columnist and politician
 Holmes Beckwith (1884–1921), American political scientist and professor who killed his dean and then himself 
 Holmes Colbert, Native American leader of the Chickasaw Nation and writer of the Chickasaw Nation's constitution in the 1850s
 Holmes Conrad (1840–1915), American politician, lawyer and military officer
 Holmes Herbert (1882–1956), English character actor
 Holmes Rolston III (born 1932), philosopher, author and professor
 Holmes Tuttle (1905–1989), American businessman and political adviser to Ronald Reagan

See also
 Holmes (surname)